Important Cultural Property of the Philippines is a cultural property which has been singled out from among the innumerable cultural properties as possessing "exceptional cultural, artistic, and /or historical significance" to the Philippines.

It is the second level of protection after the classification of National Cultural Treasures.

The lists of cultural properties are declared by the National Commission for Culture and the Arts, National Historical Commission of the Philippines, and the National Museum of the Philippines. Last list of important cultural properties was published on December 15, 2015.

See also 
 List of Cultural Properties of the Philippines
 Suyat

References 

Landmarks in the Philippines
Declared Cultural Properties in the Philippines